Marlborough is a market town and civil parish in the English county of Wiltshire on the Old Bath Road, the old main road from London to Bath. The town is on the River Kennet, 24 miles (39 km) north of Salisbury and 10 miles (16 km) southeast of Swindon.

History
The earliest sign of human habitation is the Marlborough Mound, a  prehistoric tumulus in the grounds of Marlborough College. Recent radiocarbon dating has found it to date from about 2400 BC. Legend has it that the Mound is the burial site of Merlin and that the name of the town comes from Merlin's Barrow. More plausibly, the town's name possibly derives from the medieval term for chalky ground "marl"—thus, "town on chalk". However more recent research, from geographer John Everett-Heath, identifies the original Anglo-Saxon place name as Merleberge, with a derivation from either the personal name of Mærle combined with  beorg (hill), or meargealla beorg: hill where gentian grows. On John Speed's map of Wiltshire (1611), the town's name is recorded as Marlinges boroe. The town's motto is Ubi nunc sapientis ossa Merlini ("Where now are the bones of wise Merlin").

Further evidence of human occupation comes from the discovery in St Margaret's Mead of the Marlborough Bucket, an Iron Age burial bucket made of fir wood with three iron hoops, a top bar and two handles; it also sports bronze bands decorated with human heads and mythical animals, and is now on display at the Wiltshire Museum in Devizes.

Roman remains and the large Mildenhall Hoard of coins have been found two miles to the east of Marlborough, at Mildenhall (Cunetio). A later Saxon settlement grew up around The Green and two early river crossings were made at Isbury Lane and Stonebridge Lane.

In 1067 William the Conqueror assumed control of the Marlborough area and set about building a wooden motte-and-bailey castle, sited on the prehistoric mound. This was completed in around 1100. Stone was used to strengthen the castle in around 1175. The first written record of Marlborough dates from the Domesday Book in 1087. William also established a mint in Marlborough, which coined the William I and the early William II silver pennies. The coins display the name of the town as Maerlebi or Maerleber.

He also established the neighbouring Savernake Forest as a favourite royal hunting ground and Marlborough castle became a Royal residence. Henry I observed Easter here in 1110. Henry II stayed at Marlborough castle in talks with the King of Scotland. His son, Richard I ("Coeur de Lion") gave the castle to his brother John, in 1186. King John was married here and spent time in Marlborough, where he established a Treasury.

In 1204 King John granted Charter to the Borough which permitted an annual eight-day fair, commencing on 14 August, the vigil of the Feast of the Assumption of Our Lady (15 August), in which "all might enjoy the liberties and quittances customary in the fair at Winchester". He also established that weekly markets may be held on Wednesdays and Saturdays. These continue to this day.

Henry III held Parliament here, in 1267, when the Statute of Marlborough was passed (this gave rights and privileges to small land owners and limited the right of the King to take possession of land). This law states that no-one shall seize his neighbour's goods for alleged wrong without permission of the Court. Apart from Charters, it is the oldest statute in English law which has not yet been repealed.

The castle fell into disrepair by the end of the 14th century but remained Crown property. Edward VI then passed it to the Seymour family, his mother's relatives. In 1498 Thomas Wolsey was ordained priest in (the now redundant) St Peter's church. He later rose to become a cardinal and Lord Chancellor.

In 1642 Marlborough's peace was shattered by the English Civil War. The Seymours held the Castle for the King but the town was for Parliament. With his headquarters in nearby Oxford, King Charles had to deal with Marlborough. "A Town the most notoriously disaffected of all that Country, otherwise, saving the obstinacy and malice of the inhabitants, in the situation of it very unfit for a garrison... this place the King saw would prove quickly an ill neighbour to him, not only as it was in the heart of a rich County, and so would straighten him, and even infest his quarters."

The King sent Lord Digby who left Oxford to take the town at the head of four hundred horse on 24 November 1642. When he arrived, he chose to parley first, thus giving the inhabitants a chance to prepare defences and to recruit troops. They mustered about seven hundred poorly armed men. At this point, the town issued a reply to Digby: "The King's Majesty, providing he were attended in Royal and not in war like wise, should be as welcome to that town as ever was Prince to People; but as to delivering up the good Town of Marlborough to such a traitor as Lord Digby ... they would sooner die". After some early skirmishes, Royalist troops infiltrated the town down its small alleyways. The town was captured and looted and many buildings were set ablaze. One hundred and twenty prisoners were marched in chains to Oxford. The town was later abandoned by the King and took no further part in the war.

On 28 April 1653 the Great Fire of Marlborough started in a tanner's yard and spread quickly, eventually after four hours burning the Guildhall, St Mary's Church, the County Armoury, and 244 houses to the ground. This event attracted more than local attention; the parish register of Wotton-under-Edge, in the west of Gloucestershire, records on 9 August 1653 that 18 pounds 17 shillings and six and a half pence had been collected in the parish for the relief of the distressed inhabitants of Marlborough. During the rebuilding of the town after the Great Fire, the high street was widened and is often claimed to be the widest in England though the actual widest is in Stockton-on-Tees. This wide street allows ample space for the local market. Fire swept through the town again in 1679 and 1690. This time, an Act of Parliament was passed "to prohibit the covering of houses and other buildings with thatch in the Town of Marlborough".

In 1804 the Marlborough White Horse was cut on a downland slope southwest of the town, by boys from Mr Greasley's Academy in the High Street.

In 1901 and 1934 the boundaries of the borough were extended to include the hamlet of Preshute (which was separated from Preshute civil parish) and the village of Manton, both to the west of the town. Marlborough Town Hall was completed in 1902.

In 2004 Marlborough celebrated 800 years of its Town Charter. Among the celebrations were a street play by the Marlborough Players titled Wheels of Time, and a visit from the Prince of Wales.

Events
The Marlborough mop fair was originally a market where local goods could be sold or bartered.  It later developed into a hiring fair for agricultural workers seeking employment, but now has become a travelling funfair. It takes place over two weekends in October, as the "big mop" and "little mop" fairs. In 2014 these were set for 3–4 and 17–18 October.

From 1986 a music festival was held in the town for a number of days in June or July. In 1997 this became the Marlborough International Jazz Festival, which ceased after 2016.

Notable buildings

The parish church of St Mary is Grade I listed building.

St George's church in Preshute, adjoining Manton dates from the 12th century and was substantially restored in 1854 by T.H. Wyatt. It is Grade II* listed.

The Church of St Peter and St Paul at the west end of the High Street is Grade II* listed. It dates from the 15th century and was partly rebuilt by T.H. Wyatt in 1862–3. Cardinal Wolsey was ordained priest here in 1498.

On the north side of the high street is the Merchant's House, which is currently under restoration but part of which is open to the public for guided tours on Tuesdays, Fridays and Saturdays from April to October. The house was built following the Great Fire of 1653. It was the property of a silk merchant and, rarely for a house of this type in a town centre, retains its original room pattern. Notable are the wall paintings recently uncovered, which are undergoing conservation. One room painted in a striped pattern, copying silk hangings, is perhaps unique in Great Britain.

Governance
Marlborough is within the county of Wiltshire, and the administrative district of the same name. For local government purposes, it is administered by the Wiltshire Council unitary authority. Since the local boundary review of 2020, the parish has two wards for both parish and council elections – Marlborough East and Marlborough West. Marlborough and Manton collectively form a civil parish with a parish council known as the Marlborough Town Council, which has 16 councillors. 

Prior to 2009, Wiltshire was part of the now abolished non-metropolitan county of Wiltshire. It was governed by Wiltshire County Council at the county level and the Kennet District Council.

Marlborough is part of the Devizes constituency, represented in the House of Commons since 2019 by Danny Kruger, a Conservative. Its representative has been a Conservative since 1924.

Education

Marlborough College, an independent boarding school, is on the west side of the town.

The town's local authority secondary school, St John's Academy had been considered an above average school and sixth form college by Ofsted, and in the June 2014 report it was considered outstanding. It was formed when the former Marlborough Grammar School and secondary modern school were amalgamated. There is also a primary school, St Mary's.

Sport
Marlborough is home to Marlborough Rugby Club, who completed their most successful season in recent history in the 2009–10 South West Division Dorset & Wilts 1 North league, winning all 22 games to secure promotion to the Southern Counties South league. Since 2018 the first XV has competed in South West 1 East. The club has a second XV senior team as well as many junior players.

Marlborough Town F.C. play their home games at Elcot Lane, to the east of the town, and are members of the Wiltshire League. There is a youth football club, Marlborough Youth FC, with over 350 players that play in the North Wiltshire Youth Football League. There is a cricket team whose 1st X1 compete in the WEPL Wiltshire Premier Division.

Marlborough Hockey Club play at Marlborough College. A parkrun takes place on Marlborough Common every Saturday.

Religion

The town is at the heart of the Church of England Marlborough deanery in the diocese of Salisbury in the province of Canterbury. The rural dean has responsibility for the benefices of Marlborough, Ridgeway, Upper Kennet and Whitton which in total comprise 16 parishes. Of the town's two Church of England parish churches, St Peter's has been made redundant and converted into an arts centre. St Mary's, a Grade I listed building, remains in use for worship.

The renowned jockey Sir Gordon Richards is buried in the new cemetery on Marlborough Common, the second of two such cemeteries to be opened after the two old churchyards stopped being used for burials.

Transport
Although once served by two railway lines (the Great Western Railway and the Midland and South Western Junction Railway) the town no longer has any direct rail access. The nearest stations are Pewsey (6.7 miles), Bedwyn (6.9 miles), and Swindon (12.7 miles).
Marlborough is well connected by road with the A4 from Hungerford to Calne, A346 from Tidworth to Swindon and A345 from Salisbury meeting there.

The long-distance National Trail, the Wessex Ridgeway, runs from Marlborough to Lyme Regis in Dorset.

Notable people

Brett Angell, former footballer
Bo Bruce, singer
David Brudenell-Bruce, Earl of Cardigan, 31st hereditary warden of Savernake Forest
Nick Drake, Folk Singer/Guitarist. He kept regular correspondence with his parents during his time boarding there, and these letters are reprinted in the book "Remembered For A While". Both Drake's father and grandfather had been educated there too.
William Golding, Nobel Prize winner; author of Lord of the Flies; grew up in the town.
Charles Hancock, painter
Phil Harding, Time Team archaeologist, educated in the town
John Ivimey (1868–1961), organist and composer, lived in Marlborough
Eglantyne Jebb, founder of Save the Children Fund; taught at St. Peter's Junior School then located at the western end of the High Street (now the Town Library).
Leonard Jennings, first-class cricketer and Royal Air Force officer
Michael Ryan, the murderer responsible for the Hungerford massacre  
Edward Thompson, second Chief Mechanical Engineer of the London and Northeastern Railway or L.N.E.R.

Twin towns
Marlborough is twinned with:
 Gunjur, the Gambia, since 1982
 Margency, France, since 2002

Climate
Marlborough has an oceanic climate somewhat influenced by its inland position and at  elevation is more prone to frost than southern coastal areas.

See also 
 Duke of Marlborough (title) - the title references the town

Notes

References

Further reading

External links

 Historic Marlborough photos at BBC Wiltshire
Day Out: Avebury and Marlborough – a 30-minute BBC TV programme made in 1982 of a day spent exploring Avebury and Marlborough at BBC Wiltshire
 "Marlborough" by A. G. Bradley in Macmillan's Magazine, Vol. LII, May to Oct., 1885, pp. 188–198

 
Towns in Wiltshire
Market towns in Wiltshire
Civil parishes in Wiltshire